RecordTV Belém (channel 10) is a Brazilian broadcast television station in Belém. It was created on June 10, 1997. It belongs to RecordTV and minority interests.

RecordTV Belém programs
Balanço Geral PA Manhã (morning news)
Fala Pará (morning news)
Balanço Geral PA (afternoon news)
Cidade Alerta Pará (afternoon news)
Pará Record (night news)
Balanço Geral PA Especial (Saturday)

Retransmitters
 Almeirim – 6 VHF
 Anajás – 10 VHF
 Bom Jesus do Tocantins – 8 VHF
 Curionópolis – 27 UHF
 Capitão Poço – 13 VHF
 Redenção – 11 VHF
 Tailândia – 11 VHF
 Santana do Araguaia – 11 VHF
 Cametá – 26 UHF
 Itupiranga – 27 UHF

RecordTV affiliates
Television channels and stations established in 1997
1997 establishments in Brazil